In the 2003–04 season, USM Blida is competing in the National 1 for the 19th season, as well as the Algerian Cup. They will be competing in Ligue 1, and the Algerian Cup.

Competitions

Overview

Source:

Goalscorers
Includes all competitive matches. The list is sorted alphabetically by surname when total goals are equal.

Assists

Clean sheets
Includes all competitive matches.

Transfers

In

Out

References

External links
 2003–04 USM Blida season at dzfoot.com 

USM Blida seasons
Algerian football clubs 2003–04 season